Île Raphael  is an island in the Saint Brandon archipelago, a group of thirty outer islands of Mauritius. The island is named after Veuve Raphaël.

Île Raphael residents amount to less than 40 people and constitute the majority of Saint Brandon's entire population. Some resident employees of Raphael Fishing Company stay and work on the island for periods of up to seven months, depending on the season. Île Raphaël is the principal base for line fishing, fly fishing and fly casting activities by local fishermen.

See also 

Mascarene Islands
 St Brandon
 Avocaré Island
 L'île du Sud
 L'île du Gouvernement
 L'Île Coco
 Raphael Fishing Company

References

Ile Raphael
 
Outer Islands of Mauritius
Reefs of the Indian Ocean
Fishing areas of the Indian Ocean
Insular ecology
Important Bird Areas of Mauritius
Flora of Mauritius
Atolls of the Indian Ocean
Biodiversity
Quarantine facilities
Fly fishing
Fishing tournaments